The International Federation of Pharmaceutical Manufacturers & Associations (IFPMA) is a trade association that represents leading innovative pharmaceutical companies at the international level and in official relations with the United Nations.

It was formed in 1968 and is based in Geneva, Switzerland.

In 2019, IFPMA released a strengthened code of ethics and professional standards.

The pharmaceutical industry collaborates with partners towards achieving the Sustainable Development Goals SDGs.  Over 35 IFPMA member companies work with academia, development organizations, NGOs, foundations and other business sectors. Today, there are more than 250 collaborations to strengthen health systems and expand access to quality healthcare.

See also
Portuguese Pharmaceutical Industry Association

References

External links

Pharmaceutical industry